Cereal Killer is a video-only album released by comedy metal/punk group Green Jellö in 1992. The longform video was certified Gold by the RIAA. The entire album was later re-released as a CD in 1993 as Cereal Killer Soundtrack, which also received Gold certification by the RIAA.

Track listing

References

Green Jellÿ albums
1991 video albums
1991 compilation albums
Music video compilation albums
Zoo Entertainment (record label) compilation albums
Zoo Entertainment (record label) video albums
Albums produced by Sylvia Massy